My Foolish Heart may refer to:

 My Foolish Heart (1949 film), an American film starring Susan Hayward
 My Foolish Heart (2018 film), a Dutch biographical film
 "My Foolish Heart" (song), a 1949 popular song by Victor Young and Ned Washington, introduced in that movie
 My Foolish Heart (Don Friedman album), 2003
 My Foolish Heart (Keith Jarrett album), 2007
 My Foolish Heart (Ralph Towner album), 2017
 "My Foolish Heart", a song performed by Jazmine Sullivan on her album Fearless

See also
 Foolish Heart (disambiguation)